The Lindner Family Tennis Center is a tennis facility in Mason, Ohio. It is the home of the Western & Southern Open and is owned by Tennis for Charity, Inc. The grounds include four permanent tennis stadia (Center Court, Grandstand Court, Court 3 and Court 10), distinguishing the center as the only world tennis venue, apart from the four Grand Slam venues, with more than two permanent stadia. Center Court, built in 1981 and expanded many times since, has a capacity of 11,400. Grandstand Court, built in 1995, has a capacity of 5,000. Court 3, built in 2010, seats 4,000. Court 10, built in 1997 and originally named Court 3, has a capacity of 2,000.

Its name, The Lindner Family Tennis Center, pays tribute to the family of a former tournament sponsor, the late Cincinnati financier, Carl Lindner, Jr.

Browning Day of Indianapolis has been the architectural firm of record for the Center since its conception.

History
The location became home to the tournament now known as the Western & Southern Open (or Cincinnati Masters) in 1979 when tournament organizers grew weary of perennial Ohio River flooding at its venue of the time, the Coney Island amusement park. One of the tournament sponsors, Taft Broadcasting, owned the Kings Island Amusement Park in Mason, as well as the Golf Center at Kings Island, which was located on land directly across Interstate 71 from the park. When the chairman of Taft Broadcasting, Charles Mechem, suggested the tournament move to land at the Golf Center, tournament organizers, led by Paul M. Flory, agreed.

Four courts of DecoTurf II were initially installed at the new location, and the bleachers used at Coney Island were shipped up I-71 and placed around one of them to form Center Court. Two years later, those bleachers were removed and the first phase of construction on that court began. Enhancements to seating and amenities on Center Court have been made nearly every year since.

One of the biggest expansions came in 1987 when the original West Building was added, creating working space for players and media and luxury suites for fans. An expansion in 1990 added more suites and increased capacity on Center Court to 10,000. Construction in 1998 added two additional courts, bringing the total number of courts at the Tennis Center to 10.

In 2010, the Tennis Center was enhanced with a new "West Building," now known as The Paul M. Flory Player Center in honor of the 36-year patriarch of the tournament. The new  Player Center added space not only for players, but for media and fans as well. A canopy extends over the west stands providing more covered seating. Total Center Court seating capacity was raised from 10,500 to 11,400 after the renovation.

In 2011 the grounds were expanded by more than 40% and six courts were added (increasing the total number of courts from 10 to 16), including Court 3 which serves as the third television court for the tournament. The expansion also included a new front entrance, entry plaza and ticket office. Harry Ewers & Sons, Inc. was chosen to construct and maintain the facility tennis courts.

In 2012, the tournament expanded the food court and exhibit areas and also enhanced the northern entrance.

Other events

The venue also hosts the Atlantic 10 Conference Tennis Championships and the Ohio Athletic Conference Tennis Championships, and has hosted the Association of Volleyball Professionals Cincinnati professional sand volleyball tournament, special events such as concerts and Hospice of Cincinnati's annual fundraising event, and numerous national and regional high school tennis tournaments.

It has also hosted the Cincinnati AVP Pro Beach Volleyball Championship Series.

Starting in the 2015–2016 school year, the Ohio High School Athletic Association has announced that their state championship tournament will be held at the Lindner Family Tennis Center.  The tournament was previously held at The Ohio State University and the Elysium Tennis Center.

See also
 List of tennis stadiums by capacity

References

From Club Court to Center Court by Phillip S. Smith, pages 33 & 43 (2008 Edition).

External links 
Official website of the Western & Southern Open

Tennis venues in the United States
Sports venues in Cincinnati
Buildings and structures in Warren County, Ohio
Tourist attractions in Warren County, Ohio
1979 establishments in Ohio
tennis
Sports venues completed in 1979
Outdoor arenas
Tennis in Ohio